Hockey Club Admiral, Also Known as The Admiral Vladivostok,are a professional ice hockey team based in Vladivostok, Primorsky Krai, Russia. They are members of the Chernyshev Division of the Eastern Conference of the Kontinental Hockey League (KHL). Admiral play their home games at Fetisov Arena, which has a capacity of 7,500.

Admiral joined the league in 2013 as an expansion team, which made them one of only two teams in the Russian Far East, along with Amur Khabarovsk. They played seven seasons in the KHL before going dormant for the 2020–21 season for financial considerations due to the COVID-19 pandemic.  It was announced that the team will return to the KHL for the 2021–22 season, after a one season hiatus.

History
At the request of the governor of Primorsky Krai, Vladimir Miklushevsky, the creation of the club was honored upon a member of the Federation Council of the Territory, Vyacheslav Fetisov. On 21 April 2013, it was decided that Admirals would join the Kontinental Hockey League in the 2013–14 season. [3]  

Admiral's name and logo were determined by the public. The names of Admiral, Orca and "Outpost" were offered for vote, where Admiral won with 72.2% of the vote. Located in the Maritime Province, its logo features a blue anchor supported by Cyrillic white letter 'Admiral'.

On 17 June 2013, the KHL held its first ever league expansion draft to form the Admiral roster. The Admirals had the right to choose one of five skaters submitted by each KHL club, except foreign clubs and Lokomotiv Yaroslavl, who were rebuilding from the 2011 Lokomotiv Yaroslavl plane crash. Under the terms of the draft, Admiral were allowed to select up to 7 foreign players, including no more than one goaltender. Admiral would initially select 19 players, including a goaltender.

On 27 July 2013, Rubin Tyumen and Admiral signed a co-operation affiliation agreement, between the KHL and the secondary tier VHL.  On 1 August 2013, a vote on uniforms of the team was completed: the number 1 option won out with the public, a dark blue uniform decorated with the image of an anchor.

On 6 September 2013, Admiral Vladivostok played their first match in the KHL championship against provincial rivals Amur Khabarovsk. The first goal scored in the club's history was scored by Swedish forward Nicklas Bergfors, and the match ended in Admiral's first shootout victory with a score of 4–3. On 2 December 2013 Vladivostok fired its inaugural coach Hannu Jortikka due to a conflict with club management. Three days later Admiral announced that Sergei Svetlov, Olympic champion of 1988 with the USSR national hockey team, would assume the head coaching responsibilities.

On 7 January 2014, in a match with Severstal Cherepovets, Justin Hodgman scored the 100th goal in the club's history. In a fourth-place finish in the Chernyshev division, Admiral made the playoffs in their first season, losing in the first round for the Gagarin Cup 2–4 to Metallurg Magnitogorsk. In the off-season, on 21 May 2014, it was announced that Dusan Gregor would become the third coach in club history.

On 1 April 2020, it was reported that Admiral Vladivostok was to withdraw from the 2020–21 KHL season due to financial problems stemming from the COVID-19 pandemic. The club's main sponsor, Vladivostok sea port was adversely affected by the worldwide pandemic and could not finance the team as planned. On 31 March, 2021, the KHL Board announced that Vladivostok would return to the league in time for the 2021–22 season, providing that the team pay off all of its outstanding debt before 31 July. On the beginning of payment of their debts associated to player payments in past seasons, Vladivostok were granted permission to sign players for the upcoming season. To mark their return for the 2021–22 season and signify a new chapter in the franchise, Admiral chose to rebrand their logo and colours, a first major change since their inception in 2013.

After a concerning start to pre-season and friendly matches, Admiral dismissed newly hired Sergei Vostrikov on 13 August 2021. Moving on from Vostrikov's brief tenure, Admiral turned to former Head Coach Alexander Andrievsky on a one-year agreement on 20 August 2021.

Season-by-season record
Note: GP = Games played, W = Wins, OTW = Overtime/shootout wins, OTL = Overtime/shootout losses, L = Losses, Pts = Points, GF = Goals for, GA = Goals against

Players

Current roster

Team captains

Enver Lisin, 2013
Andrei Nikitenko, 2013–2014
Ilya Zubov, 2014–2015
Oskars Bartulis, 2015–2018
Konstantin Glazachev, 2018–2020
Dmitri Lugin, 2021
Libor Šulák, 2021–

Head coaches

Hannu Jortikka, 2013
Sergei Svetlov, 2013–2014
Dusan Gregor, 2014
Sergei Shepelev, 2014–2015
Alexander Andrievsky, 2015–2017
Fredrik Stillman, 2017
Andrei Razin, 2017–2018
Oleg Leontyev*, 2018
Sergei Svetlov, 2018–2020
Sergei Vostrikov, 2021
Alexander Andrievsky, 2021–2021
Leonids Tambijevs, 2021–

References

External links
  

 
2013 establishments in Russia
Admiral
Admiral
Sports clubs in Vladivostok
Ice hockey clubs established in 2013
Chernyshev Division (KHL)